Mantissa Plantarum Altera, (abbreviated Mant. Pl. Alt.), is an illustrated book with botanical descriptions which was edited by the Swedish naturalist Carl Linnaeus in the year 1771.

Mantissa Plantarum Altera was the continuation of Mantissa Plantarum published in 1767 as an appendix to the 12th edition of Systema Naturae.

References

External links

 (free-text searchable)

Botany books
1771 books
18th-century Latin books